Maigret and the Saturday Caller is a novel by the Belgian writer Georges Simenon. The original French version Maigret et le Client du samedi appeared in 1962.

A man visits Inspector Jules Maigret at his home to tell him he wants to kill his wife and her lover. Although it is not an official case, Maigret is interested, particularly when the man later disappears.

Summary
Maigret's expected Saturday evening in January, of a meal and watching his recently installed television, is suspended when Léonard Planchon, a nervous man with a hare lip, visits him. He has often called at Police Headquarters on a Saturday and left before seeing Maigret; this time he has followed Maigret home. He tells him he wants to murder his wife and her lover.  Maigret has not been sought out at home before and is interested in Planchon. In a long conversation, Planchon, who has a decorating business, tells Maigret how he met his wife, and about Roger Prou, an employee. Prou has moved into his house and into his bedroom; Planchon has to sleep on a camp bed. In the evenings he visits bistros and gets drunk. Maigret tells Planchon to phone him every day.

On Sunday morning Maigret phones Headquarters and asks if there are any reports from the 18th arrondissement of Paris, where Planchon lives, thinking there might be a murder. In the afternoon, Maigret and his wife take a walk past Planchon's home; on Monday he gets colleagues, pretending to be council surveyors, to look round the house. In the evening Planchon phones, but he does not phone next day. On Wednesday, having still not heard from him, Maigret phones the house; Prou replies, saying Planchon will not be back.

Maigret visits the house and sees Planchon's wife Renée; she says that Planchon left with suitcases on Monday evening, and that three weeks earlier he had signed the business over to Prou.

Although Maigret is not sure what sort of case he is investigating, he manages to get permission from the Deputy Prosecutor to interview Planchon's employees. The last interview is with Prou, who explains how he found the cash for Planchon's business, some of it borrowed from relatives. During the interview Maigret borrows the transfer document and a graphologist examines it: he thinks Planchon's signature on it may have been forged.

Maigret's colleagues check the bars frequented by Planchon. A prostitute is found who knew him: on Monday he was so drunk she helped him back to his house. Maigret, aware that Planchon could not have left with suitcases if he was too drunk to stand, persuades the Deputy Prosecutor to give him a search warrant, and the house is searched. When a bundle of banknotes is found under floorboards, the case soon reaches a conclusion.

References

1962 Belgian novels
Maigret novels
Novels set in Paris
Belgian novels adapted into films